This is a list of notable alumni of Oregon State University, a university in Corvallis, Oregon in the United States. The university traces its roots back to 1856 when Corvallis Academy was founded. It wasn't formally incorporated until 1858 when the name was changed to Corvallis College, and wasn't chartered until 1868. In 1890 the school became known as Oregon Agricultural College, in 1927 it was known as Oregon State Agricultural College, and the current name was adopted in 1961. Alumni from each of these eras may be included on the list, and more than 200,000 people have attended the university since its founding.

Science, engineering, and academics

Politics and diplomacy

Business

Journalism and arts

Military

Olympians and historic endeavorers

Athletics and sport

See List of Oregon State University athletes.

Other

Legend

See also
List of Oregon State University athletes
List of Oregon State University faculty and staff
List of people from Oregon

Notes and references

Oregon State alumni

A